Ronald William Thomas Bray (5 January 1922 – 22 April 1984) was a British Conservative politician.

Bray was Member of Parliament for Rossendale from 1970 to 1974, when he lost the seat to Labour's Michael Noble in the October election of that year.

References 
Times Guide to the House of Commons October 1974

External links 
 

1922 births
1984 deaths
Conservative Party (UK) MPs for English constituencies
UK MPs 1970–1974
UK MPs 1974